Membrolles is a former commune in the Loir-et-Cher department of central France. On 1 January 2016, it was merged into the new commune of Beauce la Romaine. Its population was 268 in 2019.

See also
Communes of the Loir-et-Cher department

References

Former communes of Loir-et-Cher